Fairchild TV News is the news division of Fairchild TV, a Cantonese cable television network in Canada. It competes against the Cantonese Omni News broadcasts aired by Rogers' Omni Television stations. Since 2017, Fairchild has produced the Chinese-language newscasts aired by Omni.

Operations

Fairchild TV produces one hour-long newscast every day. It airs at 19:00 local time in both Vancouver and Toronto.

From 19:00 to 19:30, the newscast is produced separately from newsrooms in Vancouver and Toronto, and the audience in each market receives its own appropriate edition. Domestic and international news items are covered (with the items often shared between the two editions). Local news items are tailored specifically for each edition so the coverage is relevant to its local audience (i.e. local news items from Toronto will seldom appear on the Vancouver edition, and vice versa). The two editions are also presented by different anchors, with each newsroom supplying two of its own on-air personnel.

Due to Toronto being 3 hours ahead of Vancouver and such, their newscast being broadcast first, from 19:30 to 20:00, the non-local newscast segments are produced at the Toronto newsroom and repeated in Vancouver. This section of the newscast covers news items from the Greater China region (China, Hong Kong and Taiwan), lifestyle and feature reports, business news, sports and weather. A separate Toronto-based sports anchor presents the sports segment, and the two Toronto news anchors handle the business report and weather forecast.

Fairchild TV does have several reporters based in both cities to cover local news. However, most local and national/international news footages are usually sourced from the mainstream networks (in general Global TV for the former, and Canadian Broadcasting Corporation for the latter), with footages from the Greater China region provided by China Central Television (CCTV) in mainland China, TVB in Hong Kong, and various sources in Taiwan.

The nightly newscast is lived at 11:30 pm local time.

News production is completely handled in Toronto on weekends. The newscast goes from 7:00pm to 7:40pm on Saturdays, and 7:00pm to 7:30pm on Sundays.

Fairchild TV does not have designated anchors for its newscast. Instead, its anchor lineup varies from night to night, as was the usual practice at television stations in Hong Kong. (Hong Kong’s TVB currently assigns shifts to its anchors on an approximately monthly basis).

In 2017, Rogers Communications subcontracted Fairchild to produce the relaunched Cantonese and Mandarin-language Omni News programs for Omni Television; the newscasts are produced under the direction and editorial control of Rogers.

History

Until 2001

Prior to 2001, Fairchild’s Vancouver and Toronto operations were separate. The station operated as two separate feeds, one for each city, and the two feeds often had slightly different schedules from each other.

Each feed also had its own completely separate newscast, produced at its own facility. Viewers in Toronto never saw an anchor from Vancouver, and vice versa. The newscast was aired at 19:30 local time, and presented by only one anchor. Each feed also had its local weather segment, which was aired immediately after the newscast as a separate programme in and of itself.

2001-2004
However, this split-feed arrangement breached the station’s Canadian Radio-television and Telecommunications Commission (CRTC) licensing conditions. As such, Fairchild TV was forced to merge the two feeds back into a single national feed in 2001. Vancouver viewers now received exactly the same feed (other than local commercials) as those in Toronto, only on a three-hour delay due to time difference.

Under the single national feed, initially the bulk of the newscast was produced in Toronto, with only a brief segment produced in Vancouver consisting of regional items from Western Canada (primarily from Metro Vancouver itself). The weather forecast was also completely produced in Toronto. Gradually, Vancouver’s production team received more airtime, as it took over production of the Greater China news segment.

Not only did the Vancouver newsroom receive less airtime overall; it was also unable to cover local news effectively. The Vancouver newsroom had been heavily dependent on Global BC for local news footages, and prior to the changeover, it routinely taped footages off Global BC’s 18:00 newscast to air on its own bulletin. However, under the single national feed, the Vancouver newsroom had to link up with Toronto at 16:30 Pacific in order to meet the 7:30pm Eastern deadline for the newscast. As such, the Vancouver newsroom now had to tape Global BC’s noon or even morning newscast instead (which often carried items from the previous day), resulting in Vancouver news items often being shown on a one-day delay.

To partly remedy this problem, the station launched a 23:00 newscast, titled Western Canada Late News (加西晚間新聞). This gave the Vancouver newsroom another opportunity to link up at 20:00 PT for a 23:00 ET deadline, and allowed it to use footages from Global BC’s 18:00 newscast. Western Canada Late News was completely produced at the Vancouver studio.

The main evening newscast's starting time was moved up from 19:30 to 19:00 local time in June 2003. In conjunction with the schedule change, the Vancouver operation debuted a new open studio, with a view of the newsroom behind the anchors.

Since 2004

The shortcomings of this national setup were apparent to Fairchild, which petitioned to the CRTC to amend its licensing conditions. The request was granted, and Fairchild revamped its news production in fall 2004. (Details of the revamped newscast have been discussed in the “Operations” section.)

Since the Vancouver newsroom now had more airtime and no longer had to run any items on a one-day delay, “Western Canada Late News” was promptly cancelled.

In early 2006, the entire Vancouver studio was relocated to the third floor of Richmond's Aberdeen Centre (a shopping mall owned by the Fairchild Group), and a new newsroom studio was opened. Visitors of Aberdeen Centre can now watch the studio production of newscast through the windows.

Format

Until 2001, each feed’s newscast was presented by a solo anchor, who was not seen at all on the other feed. After the single feed went into effect in 2001, most of the newscast is presented by a Toronto-based anchor, with a Vancouver-based anchor presenting a brief segment of Western Canadian news.

In 2003, in conjunction with the move to a 19:00 starting time, the evening newscast also became completely duo-anchored, with two anchors based in Toronto and another two in Vancouver. With the introduction of the duo-anchor format also came "happy talk", involving the two co-anchors exchanging supposedly casual conversations. Initially the bantering was at times rather forced and awkward; however, the conversations now sound more natural, as the anchors have apparently become more accustomed to this format. The "happy talk" format was further supplemented with the addition of a Toronto-based sports anchor in 2004.

For its entire existence, Western Canada Late News was solo-anchored.

Until January 1, 2018, Sports reporting is presented in the Toronto segment with alternating sports anchor.

There is no specific weather or business presenter as the task is completed by one of two anchors.

From January 1, 2018 to March 2020 then May 2022 onwards, the newscast was broadcast only in the Vancouver newsroom.

During the COVID-19 Pandemic, the newscast is presented by one anchor.

Current Affairs programming

Along with its nightly newscast, Fairchild TV News also produces programming pertaining to current and public affairs, including:

Magazine 26 (26分鐘見證實錄) - from Vancouver
Chatting Platform (時事評台) - from Vancouver
Timeline Magazine(時代雜誌) - from Toronto
Media Focus (傳媒對焦) - from Toronto

TVB News

Instead of producing its own morning or noon newscasts, Fairchild TV airs satellite feeds of newscasts from Hong Kong's TVB during these day parts:

An overseas edition of TVB's 1 pm newscast is shown twice, at 07:30 and 07:50 local time;
An overseas edition of TVB's newscast from the TVB News Channel is shown once at 8:30 local time
An overseas edition of TVB's flagship 18:30 newscast is shown twice, at 09:00 and 12:00 local time

News Team
News production studios and bureaus are located in Toronto (Richmond Hill, Ontario) and Vancouver (Richmond, British Columbia). Reporters (and camera crew) may travel to remote locations if needed and mostly within Canada. There have been several occasions where reporters have travelled overseas, mainly to Hong Kong.

In total there are 24 onscreen personalities in the news division.

Toronto (Richmond Hill, ON) Bureau

Kate Chan (陳品姬) - Anchor/Reporter
Lawman Au (區憲章) - Sports Anchor
Laurence Leung (梁健恆) - Anchor/Reporter
Titus Leung (梁超明) - Reporter
Catherine Ho (何家碧) - Host, Media Focus
Rebecca Lau (劉雨薇) - Reporter

Vancouver (Richmond, BC) Bureau

 Vincent Ng (吳偉基) - Editor
 Ada Luk (陸小雯) - Anchor/Magazine 26 Producer
 Hon Sang Chan (陳瀚生) - Anchor/Assignment Editor
 Clement Tang (鄧曉恩) - Anchor/Editor
 Carol Xu (許嘉雯) - Anchor/Reporter
 Kelvin So (蘇學楠）- Reporter
 Kevin Cheng (鄭家穎）- Reporter

Former Anchors and Reporters
 Chan Yiu Yin (陳耀燕)
 Tsai Hiu Tung (齊曉東)
 Chan Long (陳朗)
 Chan Yim Wai (陳炎威)
 Cheung Chee On (張子安)
 Cissie Yee (余思詩) - former reporter
 Endora Fan (范美芬) - former anchor, now with Richmond Hospital Foundation
 Cheung Yan Ping (張欣萍)
 Koo Ming (顧明)
 Shelley Wong (黄瑜) - anchor/reporter
 Ka Lai Ming (賈麗明)
 Kwok Kam Chau (郭錦洲)
 Jessica Lai (賴佩儀)
 Lam Wing Tim (林泳甜)
 Lee Yee Lam (李伊琳) - reporter
 Lee Chai Ming (李濟明) - now with Talentvision
 Kenneth Lei Lap Poon (李立本) - now reporter with OMNI.2 Toronto
 Lee Ping Yan (李炳恩)
Isa Lee (李思韻) - former anchor and now Markham City Councillor
 Eric Lee (李潤庭)
 Leung Kwok-Shu (梁國書) - now with KTSF-TV San Francisco
 Loh Yan Wai (羅恩惠)
 Luk Man Yee (陸曼怡)
 Luk Ngai Pang (陸毅鵬)
 Stanley So (蘇凌峰) - later anchor and producer with OMNI.2 Toronto; now retired
 Charles Mak (麥世文) - now anchor at CHMB AM1320
 Karen So (蘇嘉欣) - now anchor at OMNI Vancouver
 Wong Ka Yin (黃嘉妍)
 Wong Tai Kwan (黃大鈞) - former anchor, now with TVB News in Hong Kong
 Simon Lee (李景鴻) - former anchor/report, now with Bloomberg News in Hong Kong
 Florence Ho (何潔雯)
 Anthony Ting (丁樂堯)
 Karen Tso (曹嘉欣)
 Karen Ha (夏婉嘉)
 Joanne Lau (劉頌恩)
 Spencer Gall (過智溢) - former anchor, now at Richmond Hospital Foundation
 Sabrina Chan (陳妍筠)
 Aurelien Ng (吳雲甫) - now with TVB in Hong Kong
Daniel Ting (丁晧峯) - former sports anchor
Ritch Lau (劉肇麟) - former anchor/reporter, now Markham Ward 2 Councillor

References

External links
 Fairchild TV

1990s Canadian television news shows
2000s Canadian television news shows
2010s Canadian television news shows
2020s Canadian television news shows
Television shows filmed in British Columbia
Television shows filmed in Ontario